Catherine Taft is an art critic, curator, and writer. Taft has been published in Artforum, i-D Magazine, Modern Painters, ArtReview, Metropolis-M, Kaleidoscope Publishing, and multiple exhibition catalogs and artist books. She has writing in Part-Objects, an artist book for Scott Benzel that was published by Human Resources and Lockitch Press.

Taft was a Curatorial Associate in the department of Architecture and Contemporary Art of the Getty Research Institute in Los Angeles. She helped organize the Pacific Standard Time: Art in Los Angeles (2011)

References

Living people
20th-century American women writers
American art critics
American art curators
American women curators
American women non-fiction writers
Year of birth missing (living people)
21st-century American women